Constantin Budeanu (28 February 1886 – 27 February 1959) was a Romanian electrical engineer who contributed to the analysis of electric networks states and the SI system of units.

Life and work
He was born in Buzău. In 1903 he was admitted at the School of Bridges, Roads and Mines, obtaining his engineering diploma in 1909. He then studied electricity in Paris with a V. Adamachi scholarship. 

Budeanu proposed the unit electric reactive power (the term var) and he introduced the concept of deformed power in electric networks.

Writings
Puissances reactives et fictives 1927
Sistemul general practic de mărimi și unitati (The General Practical System of Quantities and Units) 1957

Awards
He was awarded the Order of Labour by the communist authorities of Romania.

Notes

References
  I.S. Antoniu Constantin Budeanu monograph, Romanian Academy's Publisher 1986

1959 deaths
1886 births
People from Buzău
Romanian electrical engineers
Titular members of the Romanian Academy
Politehnica University of Bucharest alumni
Academic staff of the Politehnica University of Bucharest